Françoise Hardy Sings in English is a studio album of the French popular singer Françoise Hardy. It was released in United Kingdom in early September 1966, on LP, disques Vogue/Vogue international industries (VRL 3025), and in France, in the last week of the same month, on entitled LP, In English, disques Vogue/Vogue international industries (CLD 699. 30).

In 1965, the song "All Over The World" from this album reached the Top 50 in the United Kingdom, remaining in the Top 50 for 15 weeks and peaking at number 16 in the charts.  In the English-speaking world, this may be Hardy's best-known song.

Track listing 
Hardy is accompanied by the Charles Blackwell Orchestra.
 "This Little Heart" – 2:07Original title: "Ce petit cœur"Lyrics and music written by: Françoise HardyEnglish adaptation: Julian More
 "All Over The World" – 2:29Original title: "Dans le monde entier"Lyrics and music written by: Françoise HardyEnglish adaptation: Julian More
 "However Much" – 2:13Original title: "Et même"Lyrics and music written by: Françoise HardyEnglish adaptation: Julian More
 "It's Getting Late" – 1:36Original title: "Il se fait tard"Lyrics and music written by: Françoise HardyEnglish adaptation: Meredith (Fabian Bohn and Pieter Heijnen)
 "Only Friends" – 2:18Original title: "Ton meilleur ami"Lyrics and music written by: Françoise HardyEnglish adaptation: Miller
 "Say It Now"  – 2:13Lyrics and music written by: Robert Douglas SkeltonFirst performed by: Bobby Skel (1964)
 "Just Call and I'll Be There" – 2:28Lyrics and music written by: Charles BlackwellFirst performed by: P.J. Proby (1964)
 "The Rose" – 2’ 15’’Original title: "Mon amie la rose"Lyrics by: Cécile Caulier; Music written by: Cécile Caulier and Jacques LacombeEnglish adaptation: Julian More
 "Only You Can Do It" – 2’ 51’’Lyrics and music by: Charles BlackwellFirst performed by: The Vernons Girls (1964)
 "It's My Heart" – 1:45Original title: "Tu peux bien"Lyrics and music written by: Françoise HardyEnglish adaptation: Meredith (Fabian Bohn and Pieter Heijnen)
 "Another Place" – 2:02Original title: "La nuit est sur la ville"Lyrics and music written by: Françoise HardyEnglish adaptation: Julian More
 "Autumn Rendez-vous" – 2:40Original title: "Rendez-vous d'automne"Lyrics by: Jean-Max Rivière; Music written by: Gérard BourgeoisEnglish adaptation by: Meredith (Fabian Bohn and Pieter Heijnen)

Editions

LP records: first editions in the English-speaking world 
 , 1966: Françoise Hardy Sings in English, Phono Vox/disques Vogue (LPV 219).
 , 1966: Françoise Hardy Sings, disques Vogue (VF 47025).
 , 1966: In English, Disques Vogue/Vogue international industries (SVL 933.391).
 , 1966: Françoise Hardy Sings in English, disques Vogue/Vogue international industries (VLG 7014).
 , 1967: In English, disques Vogue (CLD 699-30), stereo.

Reissues on CD 
 , 1990: Françoise Hardy Sings in English, disques Vogue/Vogue international industries (CLD 699.30).
 , 2009: In English, disques Vogue/Legacy Recordings/Sony Music (8 86975 62462 1).

Notes and references 

Françoise Hardy albums
1966 albums
Disques Vogue albums